Michael Wreh (born 2 April 1979) is a Liberian footballer. He played in four matches for the Liberia national football team in 1997. He was also named in Liberia's squad for the 1996 African Cup of Nations tournament.

References

1979 births
Living people
Liberian footballers
Liberia international footballers
1996 African Cup of Nations players
Place of birth missing (living people)
Association football goalkeepers